The Church of St Margaret of Scotland, also known as St Margarets Catholic Church, is a Roman Catholic church on St Margaret's Road in St Margarets, Twickenham, in the London Borough of Richmond upon Thames.  The parish was created in 1936. The church building was designed by the architect Austin Winkley who was an influential architect of the Liturgical Movement. It opened in 1969. In 1999 it became a Grade II listed building.

The church is named after the 11th-century English Saxon princess who became Queen of Scotland when she married Malcolm III and who was canonised by Pope Innocent IV in 1250.

Mass is held on Saturday and Sunday evenings and every morning except on Thursdays.

References

External links
Official website

1969 establishments in England
20th-century Roman Catholic church buildings in the United Kingdom
Christian organizations established in 1936
Churches in St Margarets, London
Churches in the Roman Catholic Diocese of Westminster
Saint Margaret
Grade II listed churches in the London Borough of Richmond upon Thames
Grade II listed Roman Catholic churches in England
Roman Catholic churches completed in 1969
Roman Catholic churches in the London Borough of Richmond upon Thames